The 1957 Princeton Tigers football team was an American football team that represented Princeton University as a member of the Ivy League during the 1957 NCAA University Division football season. 

In their first year under head coach Dick Colman, the Tigers won the Ivy League championship, compiling an overall 7–2 record and outscoring opponents 206 to 95. John C. Sapoch Jr. was the team captain.

Princeton's 6–1 conference record was the best in the Ivy League. The Tigers outscored Ivy opponents 189 to 83.

Princeton played its home games at Palmer Stadium on the university campus in Princeton, New Jersey.

Schedule

References

Princeton
Princeton Tigers football seasons
Ivy League football champion seasons
Princeton Tigers football